Bruford may refer to:

Musical groups
Anderson Bruford Wakeman Howe
Bruford (band)
Bruford Levin Upper Extremities
Bill Bruford's Earthworks

Places
Rose Bruford College

People with the surname
Alex Bruford, founder of Infadels
Bill Bruford (born 1949), English drummer
Marjorie Frances Bruford (1902-1958), British artist
Michael W. Bruford (born 1963), British molecular ecologist and conservation biologist
Robert Bruford (1868–1939), English farmer, agriculturist and politician
Walter Horace Bruford (1894–1988), British scholar of German literature

Albums
The Bruford Tapes
Anderson Bruford Wakeman Howe (album)
Bruford Levin Upper Extremities (album)

See also
Bluford (disambiguation)
Buford (disambiguation)
Burford (disambiguation)
Bufford